is a retired Japanese long-distance runner.

She finished fifteenth in 5000 metres at the 1997 World Championships. In 10,000 metres she finished seventh at the 1996 Summer Olympics, won the bronze medal at the East Asian Games and the gold medal at the 1998 Asian Games, finished twelfth at the 1999 World Championships and tenth at the 2000 Summer Olympics.

She also finished 36th at the 1995 World Cross Country Championships, and fourth with the Japanese team.

Personal bests
3000 metres - 8:55.8 minutes (1998)
5000 metres - 15:17.34 minutes (1997)
10,000 metres - 31:09.46 minutes (2000)
Half marathon - 1:09:38 hours (2002)
Marathon - 2:34:09 hours (1999)

References

1975 births
Living people
Japanese female long-distance runners
Japanese female marathon runners
Japanese female cross country runners
Olympic athletes of Japan
Athletes (track and field) at the 1996 Summer Olympics
Athletes (track and field) at the 2000 Summer Olympics
Asian Games gold medalists for Japan
Asian Games medalists in athletics (track and field)
Athletes (track and field) at the 1998 Asian Games
Medalists at the 1998 Asian Games
World Athletics Championships athletes for Japan
Japan Championships in Athletics winners
20th-century Japanese women
21st-century Japanese women